The 2016 South Alabama Jaguars football team represented the University of South Alabama in the 2016 NCAA Division I FBS football season. The Jaguars played their home games at Ladd–Peebles Stadium in Mobile, Alabama, and competed in the Sun Belt Conference. They were led by head coach Joey Jones, who was in his eighth year with the team. They finished the season 6–7, 2–6 in Sun Belt play to finish in  a three-way tie for eighth place. They were invited to the Arizona Bowl where they lost to Air Force.

Schedule
South Alabama announced its 2016 football schedule on March 3, 2016. The 2016 schedule consists of 6 home and away games in the regular season. The Jaguars will host Sun Belt foes Georgia Southern, Georgia State, New Mexico State, and Troy, and will travel to Arkansas State, Idaho, Louisiana–Lafayette, and Louisiana–Monroe. South Alabama will skip out on two Sun Belt teams this season, Appalachian State and Texas State.

The team will play four non–conference games, two home games against Nicholls State from the Southland Conference and San Diego State from the Mountain West Conference, and two road games against Louisiana State (LSU) and Mississippi State both from the Southeastern Conference (SEC). On October 13, 2016, LSU canceled its game against the Jaguars on November 19 due to scheduling issues after Hurricane Matthew. On October 15, 2016, the Jaguars announced they will host the Presbyterian Blue Hose on November 19; the Blue Hose's game with Florida on that day was also canceled under the same circumstances.

Game summaries

at Mississippi State

Georgia Southern

at Louisiana–Lafayette

Nicholls State

San Diego State

at Arkansas State

Troy

Georgia State

at Louisiana–Monroe

Presbyterian

at Idaho

New Mexico State

vs. Air Force–Arizona Bowl

References

South Alabama
South Alabama Jaguars football seasons
South Alabama Jaguars football